Barbershop 2: Back in Business is a 2004 American comedy film directed by Kevin Rodney Sullivan and released by Metro-Goldwyn-Mayer on February 6, 2004. A sequel to 2002's Barbershop and  the second film in the Barbershop film series, also from State Street producing team Robert Teitel and George Tillman, Jr., Barbershop 2 deals with the impact of gentrification on the reputation and livelihood of a long-standing south Chicago barbershop. Ice Cube, Cedric the Entertainer, Sean Patrick Thomas, Eve, and several other actors reprise their roles from the first Barbershop film. However, a few of the original film's actors, such as Tom Wright and Jazsmin Lewis return with smaller roles.

Released theatrically by Metro-Goldwyn-Mayer on February 6, 2004, Barbershop 2 received generally positive reviews from critics and was a box office success, grossing $66 million worldwide against a production budget of $18–30 million.

Barbershop 2 also features what is billed as a "special appearance" by Queen Latifah, who starred in a spin-off, Beauty Shop which was released in March 2005.

Plot
Since the events of the previous film, Calvin Palmer, Jr. (Ice Cube) has finally settled comfortably into his role as the owner of the inner city barbershop founded by his grandfather and father. The shop's latest threat comes from overzealous developer Quentin Leroux (Harry Lennix) who opens a rival barbershop chain across the street, called "Nappy Cutz".

While Calvin attempts to figure out how to deal with the coming threat of direct competition from Quentin's flashy establishment, his barbers are having issues of their own. Isaac (Troy Garity), the lone white barber, is now the star of the shop, and begins to feel that he deserves star treatment, feeling neglected by Calvin and the other barbers. Terri (Eve) is finding success in managing her anger, but has trouble dealing with the growing mutual attraction between Ricky (Michael Ealy) and her. Dinka (Leonard Earl Howze) is still interested in Terri, but is distraught when he finds out that she loves Ricky, instead. Jimmy (Sean Patrick Thomas) has quit the shop to work for the local alderman Lalowe Brown (Robert Wisdom); his replacement, Calvin's cousin Kenard (Kenan Thompson), is fresh out of barber school and horribly inept at cutting hair. Meanwhile, the barbershop and other businesses like it are under threat from gentrification, and Calvin is offered a substantial bribe from Brown and Leroux in exchange for his support of the city council's gentrification legislation.

A subplot involves Eddie (Cedric the Entertainer) recalling his time as a young man in the late 1960s, when he first started working at the shop with Calvin's father, including the riots following the assassination of Martin Luther King Jr. Also, Eddie remembers his long-lost love, Loretta (Garcelle Beauvais-Nilon). This subplot causes Eddie and Calvin to begin bonding. The film also introduces Calvin's good friend and ex-lover, Gina (Queen Latifah), who works at the beauty shop next door. The girls at the beauty shop have similar conversations and experiences as the barbers and Gina has a bitter rivalry with Eddie.

After attempting to change his own barbershop's style and decor to match those of his rival, Calvin decides to refuse the bribe money and speak out against the neighborhood's gentrification at the local city council meeting. Though Calvin gives a passionate speech about the legislation helping the region to earn money at the cost of its soul and the community, the council still unanimously votes to approve the legislation and move forward with the project. Despite a mutual attraction, Terri and Ricky agree to remain friends (but not before sharing one last kiss). Dinka still loses out on Terri, but finds love with a stylist at Gina's beauty shop. Though the gentrification project is approved, the community remains loyal to Calvin's barbershop.

Cast
 Ice Cube as Calvin Palmer, Jr.                          Anthony Anderson as J.D 
 Cedric the Entertainer as Eddie Walker
 Sean Patrick Thomas as Jimmy James
 Harry Lennix as Quentin Leroux
 Eve as Terri Jones
 Troy Garity as Isaac Rosenberg
 Michael Ealy as Ricky Nash
 Leonard Earl Howze as Dinka
 Kenan Thompson as Kenard
 DeRay Davis as Ray the Hustle Guy
 Queen Latifah as Gina Norris
 Robert Wisdom as Lalowe Brown
 Jazsmin Lewis as Jennifer Palmer
 Tom Wright as Detective Williams
 Carl Wright as Checker Fred
 Garcelle Beauvais-Nilon as Loretta
 Keke Palmer as Gina's niece
 Marcia Wright-Tillman as Joyce
 Avant as Dexter

Reception

Box office

Barbershop 2 opened at #1 with $24,241,612. The $30 million production would go on to gross $65,111,277 in the domestic box office and $860,036 internationally for a worldwide total of $65,971,313.

Critical response
On Rotten Tomatoes the film has an approval rating of 69% based on reviews from 127 critics, with an average rating of 6.30/10. The site's critical consensus reads, "The humor is less sharp and more warm-hearted this time around, and the characters are enjoyable to revisit." On Metacritic, the film has a score of 59 out of 100 based on reviews from 34 critics.
Audiences surveyed by CinemaScore gave the film a grade "A−" on scale of A to F.

Roger Ebert of the Chicago Sun-Times wrote: "Did I like the film? Yeah, kinda, but not enough to recommend. The first film arrived with freshness and an unexpected zing, but this one seems too content to follow in its footsteps."
Variety's''' Todd McCarthy called it "A less raucous and more serious-minded neighborhood comedy than its entertaining predecessor."

Soundtrack

A soundtrack containing hip-hop and R&B music was released on February 3, 2004 by Interscope Records. It peaked at #18 on the Billboard 200 and #8 on the Top R&B/Hip-Hop Albums.

Sequel

On March 26, 2014, Deadline Hollywood reported that MGM was in negotiations with Ice Cube to produce a third Barbershop'' film.

On March 19, 2015, MGM announced that the studio has been setting up deals with Cedric the Entertainer, Queen Latifah, and Nicki Minaj to appear in the film. Malcolm D. Lee is set to direct the film and New Line Cinema (via Warner Bros.) will distribute. The film was released on April 15, 2016.

References

External links
 
 
 
 

2004 films
2004 comedy films
American sequel films
African-American comedy films
Barbershop (franchise)
Cube Vision films
Films directed by Kevin Rodney Sullivan
Films scored by Richard Gibbs
Films set in Chicago
Films shot in Chicago
Metro-Goldwyn-Mayer films
Works about gentrification
2000s English-language films
2000s American films
African-American films